A joint support ship (JSS) is a multi-role naval vessel capable of launching and supporting joint  amphibious and airlift operations. It can also provide command and control, sealift and seabasing, underway replenishment, disaster relief and logistics capabilities for combined land and sea operations.

Background

The preliminary ideas for joint support ships arose from the development of "helicopter carriers", classes of vessels such as landing platform docks (LPDs) and landing helicopter docks (LHDs) designed for the operation of rotary-wing and other types of vertical take-off and landing (VTOL) aircraft.  Unlike conventional fixed-wing aircraft carriers, these vessels do not require steam catapults for the launching of aircraft or arresting cables for the recovery or aircraft, and thus provided more space below the flight deck which could be utilised for other purposes.  Some early LHDs were converted World War II-era aircraft carriers such as the United States Navy (USN)'s Essex-class vessels, but later designs often featured non-full length flight decks, usually at rear of the vessel.

While initial emphasis was placed upon airborne operations, as the need for combined forces capabilities grew, facilitating amphibious operations also became a requirement, and later designs such as the Royal Navy (RN)'s  LPD emerged featuring a well dock to launch and recover personnel, vehicular and utility landing craft, and in the case of the USN's  LPD,  landing helicopter assault (LHA) and other similar classes of vessels, tracked amphibious landing vehicles such as the AAVP-7A1.

To support the air- and sea-going craft these vessels carried, they often featured fuel bunkers with increased storage capacity, and were often utilised as supplementary auxiliary ships to provide underway replenishment (UNREPs) to other vessels. Their absence of large calibre weapons on weather decks and with increased storage space below, they also proved very useful at sealift operations. Many also had onboard hospital facilities and the vessels served as casualty evacuation vessels. With a combination of army (or marine) and navy personnel and aircrew onboard, and often equipped with a wide range of sensor suites, these vessels were utilised as ad-hoc or formal joint command and control centres, as demonstrated during the Vietnam War, the Falklands War and the Gulf War.

With their multi-role capabilities, these vessels have also proven extremely useful in civil emergencies, providing humanitarian aid and disaster relief at times of natural disasters, and for peace-keeping duties providing logistical support for internally displaced persons (IDPs), and this capability is often factored into tender requirements during procurement processes (and which can be helpful at justifying the need for these vessels to politicians).

Examples of vessels of other classes that have undertaken multiple roles for which a JSS is intended to fulfil include:
 In 1988, an LPH of the RN, provided humanitarian aid to victims of Hurricane Mitch in Honduras and Nicaragua.  In 2012 the vessel was moored on the River Thames at Greenwich to providing logistics support, accommodation and a secure helicopter landing site for the London Olympic Games.
 From December 2001 to March 2002 , a landing platform amphibious (LPA) ship of the Royal Australian Navy (RAN), deployed to the Persian Gulf and conducted boarding parties to inspect ships transiting the waters for compliance with sanctions against Iraq, and served as the forward operating base (FOB) for US Navy SEAL teams.  In 2003 the vessel returned to the Gulf where it operated as a command and control ship during the invasion of Iraq, as well as providing logistical support to other coalition vessels in the conflict.  The ship has also provided disaster relief and humanitarian aid in South East Asia and the Oceania region, including the  2004 Boxing Day Tsunami.
 In 2020 , a LPD of the Indian Navy was used to retrieve Indian nationals stranded in the Maldives during the COVID-19 pandemic.
 Various vessels of the USN's  landing platform helicopter (LPH) ships have been used for purposes other than amphibious and airborne landings, including:
 In 1962 USS Iwo Jima operated as a control ship during the Operation Fishbowl nuclear tests at Johnston Atoll and evacuated and later return non-essential personnel to and from the site 
 between 1963 and 1971 numerous vessels of this class operated off the coast of Vietnam where their duties included mine countermeasures, search and rescue operations, underway refuelling of other task force ships, and with their 100-bed hospitals were often the primary receiving station for wounded personnel
 Between 1970 and 1972 five vessels of this class functioned as recovery ships for NASA's Apollo manned lunar program, including Iwo Jima which recovered the crew and capsule of Apollo 13
 From 1972 to 1974 USS Guam was used as an experimental sea control ship
 In 1983 Guam acted as a command and control and logistic support ship for the Multinational Force in Lebanon and in October, survivors of the Beirut barracks bombing where airlifted to Iwo Jima, which acted as a hospital ship.
 Vessels of USN's  LHDs have conducted and coordinated disaster response operations for various natural disasters, including Hurricane Katrina.

As a result of the multi-role nature of these operations, a new type of vessel emerged, the joint support ship, as a hybrid of two very different classes of vessels, amphibious assault ships and auxiliary ships.

Design features
While the specific roles that a JSS is designed to fulfil varies between navies (e.g. the Canadian Protecteur class features a reinforced hull for Arctic operations), most vessels share common features to support the basic roles they provide for both navies and armies. Below are some examples of these common features:

 Flight deck and hangars for helicopters or other VTOL aircraft (e.g. V-22 Osprey) for airlift operations and aircraft maintenance.  Typically, a JSS would not feature a full-length flight deck like that of a helicopter carrier and some classes of LHDs.
 Well dock for transporting, launching and recovering amphibious, landing or other sea-to-shore craft (e.g. LCACs,  LCUs, RHIBs, etc.)
 Sealift space for transport and transfer of heavy equipment 
 Berthing space and ordnance lockers for military personnel and their equipment
 Fuel storage tanks and dry storage for ammunition, food, and other supplies for replenishing other ships while underway.
 Seabasing command rooms for mission coordination
 Lifting equipment for the loading and unloading of deck cargo, or the launching and recovery of small watercraft
 Greater emphasis upon self-defence weapon systems than dedicated auxiliary ships, making them better suited for operating in combat zones
 Other support facilities e.g. hospital rooms.

Furthermore, to fulfil its missions a flexible modular design allows for configuration of temporary areas for different purposes as missions require. As such it is basically a combination of an amphibious warfare ship and auxiliary ships like replenishment oiler, transport ship, and hospital ship in one.

Vessels in service

Royal Canadian Navy

In 1999 the Canadian government sought to replace the Royal Canadian Navy's ageing  of auxiliary oiler replenishment (AOR) ships through the Afloat Logistic Support Capability (ALSC) program. The replacement program envisioned tanker ships with roll-on/roll-off (RORO) sealift capability. These multi-role ships were envisioned to deploy mobilised forces directly to the beach.

In 2004, Public Works and Government Services Canada (PWGSC) issued a request for proposal (RFP) for the joint support ship (JSS) to replace three AOR ships, although one AOR ship was already retired by the time the RFP was released. The RFP capped the bid price at C$1.5 billion (most reports state the cost was C$2.1bn, however C$600 million was reserved for the government's own project costs, and was not included in the RFP bid ceiling price). The RFP called for three multi-role ships capable of refuelling ships at sea, providing ship-borne helicopter support, heavy sealift capability, a mobile hospital, a joint force headquarters centre, and a strengthened hull for operations in sea ice.

PWGSC cancelled the program in 2008 after stating all the received bids were above the mandatory budget. The Canadian government restarted the JSS procurement process in the same year.

In 2013 Canada selected the  replenishment ship design to replace the Protecteur-class fleet. The German design provides fuel, provisions, ammunition, and some materiel and medical capabilities, and can land up to two helicopters.  The ships are to be built in Vancouver by Seaspan Shipyards under the National Ship Procurement Strategy (NSPS). 

Originally to be designated as the Queenston class with ship names of HMCS Queenston and HMCS Châteauguay (named after battle sites from the War of 1812), in 2017 the Royal Canadian Navy renamed the joint support ships to the former Protecteur-class designation, re-using the same ship names HMCS Protecteur and HMCS Preserver.

The cost of building the two replenishment ships was set at C$2.3bn with first delivery occurring in 2018. In 2018, the government's own review indicated the total cost was then calculated to be C$3.4bn, with first delivery not likely before 2022 or 2023. As of 2019, delivery of the first vessel was expected to occur in 2023 followed by the second vessel in 2025.  Those dates were each reported in 2022 to have slipped by a further two years.

Royal Netherlands Navy

The vessel was constructed by the Damen Group, at their shipyard in Galați, Romania, although installation of weapon systems and final fit-out was undertaken in Vlissingen, the Netherlands.  The vessel has the following design features:
 forward superstructure containing bridge and operating stations, crew and troop accommodation, medical bay, helicopter hangar, etc.
 rear weather and helicopter decks, with hangar and landing space for six and two CH-47 Chinook-sized helicopters respectively 
 port and starboard amidship underway replenishment stations 
  capacity RoRo quarter ramp
 40-ton deck crane and a steel beach stern ramp for cargo transfer to/from landing craft, with stowage for two landing craft, vehicle, personnel (LCVP) and two rigid-hull inflatable boats (RHIB) launched and recovered by davits.

In November 2014, despite the fact the vessel had only recently completed sea trials but not yet commissioned, it was sent on a three-month deployment to West Africa as part of the European Union's response to an Ebola outbreak, where it delivered ambulances, portable hospitals and medical supplies to Guinea, Liberia and Sierra Leone.

In 2016 the Dutch and German Ministers of Defence agreed that HNLMS Karel Doorman would be shared by both the Royal Netherlands Navy and the German Navy.

Planned vessels

Royal Australian Navy

In July 2020 the Australian government published its 2020 Force Structure Plan and 2020 Defence Strategic Update announcing its intention to procure two locally-built two multi-purpose auxiliary vessels able to perform both sealift and replenishment operations under project SEA2200, to replace the Royal Australian Navy's current landing ship dock (LSD) . The new class of JSS vessels would also supplement the RAN's two  LHDs which entered service commencing in 2015 to increase its combined forces projection capabilities in the region.

In anticipation of the forthcoming requirement, at the PACIFIC 2019 naval defence exposition in October 2019, Navantia, the company which produced a large number of the RAN's new vessels including the s (AORs), displayed a design for a JSS. Specific features include:
 flight deck and hangar to accommodate two MRH90 Taipan or SH-60 Seahawk helicopters
 well dock to transport, launch and recover two LHD landing craft (LLCs)
 medical and dental facilities including X-ray machines, operating rooms and intensive care ward. 

In May 2022 the BMT Group, the company that upgraded HMAS Choules when it was acquired from the Royal Navy, displayed their Ellida design at INDO PACIFIC 2022. This vessel is based on the same family of auxiliary craft as the   tankers operated by the Royal Fleet Auxiliary and features a large roll-on/roll-off (RoRo) cargo deck as well as stowage for large quantities of provisions and equipment to conduct underway replenishment.

The Damen Group, the company that constructed the JSS for the Royal Netherlands Navy, is also expected to submit their design.

In May 2021, Navantia's Australian subsidiary announced plans to expand its manufacturing capability in Western Australia, and if successful in winning the contract for the RAN's JSS, market this vessel to overseas customers.

Royal New Zealand Navy
It was reported in May 2021 that the Royal New Zealand Navy is a potential customer for further units of joint supply ships to be constructed in Australia.

Cancelled vessels

German Navy

In the mid-1990s, after the end of the Cold War and the resultant change in the both the European and global security situation, as well as the reunification with East Germany, Germany's armed forces underwent strategic transformation.  Prior to this, the focus of the Bundeswehr was on national defence, but with conflicts in the Balkans, the Gulf War and Somalia which saw multi-national responses, the focus of country's armed forces shifted towards fulfilling Germany's obligations as a member of the international community.  There was also an emphasis by NATO of preemptive intervention in "hotspots" around the globe, which required an increase in air and sea uplift capacity so as to deploy reaction forces.  Specifically, the German navy was to have the capability to transport a small peacekeeping contingent  with the vessel(s) also serving in the role of mission command and coordination. Furthermore, Somalia highlighted the need to provide humanitarian relief. 

The German Navy (Deutsche Marine), the smallest branch of the country's armed forces, was ill-equipped for these new requirements, and commenced plans to commission a suitable vessel. This resulted in the Taktische Konzept Mehrzweckschiff project - the "Tactical Concept Multipurpose ship", and in late 1994 MTG Marinetechnik GmbH, the company established by the West German government in 1966 to design warships, responded with a conceptual design for a combined command, transport and hospital vessel that could be used by all branches of the Bundeswehr for global deployments. The cost of the vessel was estimated at 620 million Deutsch Mark (approximately US$395 million).  The proposed vessel would feature:

 length  
 displacement 20,000 tonnes
 range 
 RoRo capability
 space for 271 vehicles
 8 helicopters
 1 landing craft
 berthing space for 700 military personnel 
 70-bed hospital with 2 operating rooms

However, the high cost of the proposed vessel caused alarm among certain members of the Bundestag, the country's parliament, and in March 1995 the Chairman of the Defence Committee, Klaus Rose, argued against its acquisition and in May 1995 the Minister of Defence, Volker Rühe announced the project was to be stopped.

The navy persisted that the vessel was required and in 1998 the Weizsäcker-commission was formed, which advised the government of the need for a "transport and deployment support ship". This resulted in Einsatz Truppenunterstützungsschiff (Multi purpose Carrier) specifying an even larger ship with a displacement of 18,000 tonnes, possibly based upon Navantia's Galicia class.  In 2003 this too was cancelled, apparently over concerns about the cost.  Still the navy persisted and n 2007 announced that Joint Support Ships were to be included in their 2009 plan but by this stage they did not have the support of the army and the plan did not proceed.

In 2009 the Ministry of Defence published Flotte 2025 +, its plan for the future of the navy until 2025 which not only resurrected the proposed construction of two joint supply ships, but also included two Mehrzweckeinsatzschiffs, multipurpose dock ships that would be larger than a JSS.  The plan was later updated to also include another multi-purpose ship, a Multi-role Helicopter Dock Expeditionary Support vessel of a modular design that could be reconfigured for various mission profiles and which would also be utilised for a future JSS class.  In 2016 this plan was also cancelled due to concerns over its high cost.

As a cost-saving measure, in 2016 the German Minister of Defence signed an agreement with their Dutch counterpart to share the NLMS Karel Doorman, the JSS under construction for Royal Netherlands Navy.

Similar vessels

Indian Navy

In 2011 the Indian Navy (IN) published a Request For Information (RFI) for four multi-role support vessels (MRSV), similar in requirements and capabilities to a JSS, to supplement their existing LPD . This resulted in the publication in December 2013 of a Request For Proposal (RFP) for four more LPDs, rather than a new class of vessel, to be constructed.  In November 2020 the scope of the RFP was reduced to two ships before the project was eventually cancelled before construction commenced. 

In August 2021 the IN published a new RFI for four LHDs, with the first vessel expected to enter service no earlier than 2025.  While these ships are technically LHDs they are a multi-role vessel that will undertake a similar range of duties as a JSS including:
 transport and land ashore a combined arms force 
 stow onboard and discharge combat cargo required for undertaking and sustaining the operations ashore
 enable operation of multiple means of ship to shore movement of troops and cargo
 act as Command Centre for the Commander, Amphibious Task Force, Landing Force Commander and the Air Force Commander
 act as mother ship for unmanned vehicles/ platforms/ equipment
 provide medical facilities for treatment of battle casualties
 undertake humanitarian assistance and disaster relief missions.

Royal Malaysian Navy

In September 2021 the Malaysian Minister of Defence announced that his country's government would procure two a multi-role support ships (MRSS), vessels very similar in specification to a JSS, for the Royal Malaysian Navy (RMN). The vessels would enhance the RMN's strategic sealift capabilities between Peninsular Malaysia and the East Malaysian states of Sabah and Sarawak on the island of Borneo.

The nature of the MRSS requirements leads towards a smaller version of existing amphibious assault vessels currently available from multiple international shipbuilders, including the French  and the Chinese Type 075 landing helicopter docks (LHDs), and Dutch Enforcer-class and Indonesian  landing platform docks (LPDs). Navantia Australia proposed that their design for the RAN's JSS could fulfil this role, but the proposed vessel was not included in the list of designs being considered.

The procurement of these vessels is expected to commence in 2024.

United States Navy
The USN operates the world's largest fleet of amphibious assault vessels (AAV) with a number of different classes of ships of various sizes and capabilities that can fulfil a wide range of roles. Of particular relevance to the subject of joint supply ships are the  amphibious command ship (ACS) and the  LPD.

Blue Ridge-class ACS

The Blue Ridge-class ACS are the USN's and worlds's first and only amphibious command ship, brought about due to previous command ships having insufficient speed to keep up with a  amphibious force.  They are based upon the  landing platform helicopter (LPH) ships, the USN's first class of dedicated helicopter carriers which began entering service in 1961. The basic design was modified to incorporate a bridge and operations superstructure located amidship along with a rear helicopter deck and communication and sensor masts located on the forward weather deck in place of the base vessels' island bridge and full-length flight deck. There are only two vessels in the class, USS Blue Ridge and USS Mount Whitney, and are the command vessels for the 7th and 6th Fleets respectively.

While theses vessels have greater command and control capabilities than the class upon which they are based, they are limited by the fact that they lack a well dock and are thus deficient in terms of amphibious operations compared to other classes of AAVs in the USN. They are also limited in size of the rotorcraft they can operate, with the biggest being the CH-47 Chinook, and are not able to operate the CH-53 Sea Stallion nor the MV-22 Osprey. Therefore, away from shore-based facilities, their air- and sea-lift capabilities are limited to the helicopters that they can support

They are the oldest commissioned vessels in the USN's fleet, with both vessels undergoing a major modernisation program in 2011 to extend their service lives for at least another 20 years, and Blue Ridge a US$60M propulsion plant overhaul in 2018.  However, question marks exist surrounding their remaining scheduled operating lifespan, with the navy facing budget cutbacks and placing a greater emphasis on common capital infrastructure (i.e. weapons systems, power plants, etc.) to reduce cost, and with congressional pressure to reduce the size of its amphibious fleet, with just two class members and little commonality with other classes, they may be candidates for early retirement.

San Antonio-class LPD

The San Antonio-class LPD is the USN's most numerous AAV with 12 ships currently in service as of December 2022 and with three further vessels under construction and another on order.  

The class is marketed by its builders, Ingalls Shipbuilding, as a multi-role vessel, and was described by a former Chief of Naval Operations (CNO) as "modular trucks" in reference to its versatility and sealift capacity, who proposed the fitting of modular mission bays as utilised by the navy's littoral combat ships to increase its capabilities.  Compared to earlier AAVs such as the Austin class it replaced, this class features larger and more capable sensor suites making it an ideal command and control platform, and unusual for this class of vessel (and more akin to an air warfare destroyer (AWD) features two large sensor masts.  In fact, it has been proposed that the Aegis Ballistic Missile Defense System (Aegis BDM), as fitted to the  AWDs, be fitted to this ships within class to further increase their multi-mission capabilities.

In early 2021,  was involved in trials with Martin UAV  for its V-Bat VTOL UAV.

Future vessels
There are a number of issues facing the USN's capabilities for amphibious warfare, sealift and multi-mission operations:
 Decrease in funding: budget cuts are expected in financial years 2024 and 2025 that will be result in the navy facing a "blackhole" in that they will not have sufficient funding to fulfil their proposed 5-year construction plan due to commence in 2025.
 Reduction in sealift capacity: In October 2022 the US Navy failed to meet its readiness goal for amphibious ships of 80%, with only 45% of the  fleet available.  Furthermore, the navy and the Marine Corps have differing views upon the navy's sealift capacity; while there are currently 32 vessels in the amphibious fleet the USMC is pushing for 38 vessels while the USN is looking to operate only 24-28 vessels to meet budget constraints.  Current and future capacity is being reduced by, or under threat of reduction by, the following changes:
 Increase command & control and information gathering & sharing capabilities: Among the navy's priorities is increasing the command and control capabilities of its amphibious assault fleet to take advantage of the increased amount of data the F-35 Lightning Joint Strike Fighter, operated by the Navy and the Marine Corps, can gather. However, any plan to upgrade these vessels, is, as of December 2022, currently unfunded.
While these vessels cannot fulfil all the roles of a JSS, they were supposed to be the navy's premier multi-mission vessels, and if they are removed from service would create a gap in certain capabilities for the Navy. 
 Next-Generation Logistics Ship (NGLS) Program: NGLS is quite an important project for the USN as not only will it responsible for  the Navy's next auxiliary ships but it marks a fundamental shift in the recent design philosophy that "bigger is better", which has seen most other classes of ships grow in size.  The USN's emerging doctrine of anti-access/area-denial (A2/AD) aims to create a "no-go zone" for an opposing force in times of conflict built upon more distributed fleets with a reduced proportion of larger ships and an increased proportion of smaller ships, thus lessening the risk posed by concentrated attacks on a relatively small number of large, high-value targets.  Vessels in the NGLS program will be part of that objective. Currently, the USN is constructing the new  TAO (oilers), traditional large - and expensive - vessels at more than $700 million per ship, built at a rate of just one ship per year.  The NGLS program would instead deliver a new class of smaller ships that would be less expensive and faster to construct yet meet the requirements for refuelling, rearming and resupply operations.  However, these vessels, described as "medium-sized" ships, are not intended to replace but to supplement these new vessels and existing classes such as the Fast combat support ship, with an emphasis on operations in contested and littoral environments deemed too high a risk for larger vessels.The Navy's five-year shipbuilding plan for financial years 2023–FY2027 outlines the procurement of the first NGLS in 2026 at a cost of $150 million and the second in 2027 at $156 million, each around the fifth of the cost of a John Lewis-class vessel.  It is not yet determined how many vessels will be constructed but the 30-year plan commencing 2023 proposes at least a dozen or so ships, and perhaps twice that number or more.  It is envisaged that they will be a family of vessels built upon a common modular design, rather than single type. In December 2021 Austal USA was selected for the program's design study at a cost of $2 million.

In essence, these are the same problems that other countries that operate or are acquiring joint supply ships faced.  Furthermore, it is also important to recognise the significance of the downsizing of the proposed NGLS vessels in respect to the USN's future plans. This all leads to the question - could the USN develop a JSS in the near future to satisfy its emerging needs?  While there is no such vessel currently planned, the new NGLS could be considered as a JSS in all but name, although it remains to be seen until the design is finalised as to whether these ships will feature the amphibious operations capability of similar ships in other navies.

External links
 Austral USA 
 BMT Group Ltd
 Damen Shipyard Group (Damen Holding B.V.)
 MTG Marinetechnik GmbH
 Navantia
 Seaspan Shipyards Joint Supply Ship

Notes

References

Ship types
Amphibious warfare vessels
Auxiliary ships